Dziesław may refer to the following places in Poland:
Dziesław in Gmina Ścinawa, Lubin County in Lower Silesian Voivodeship (SW Poland)
Other places called Dziesław (listed in Polish Wikipedia)